Lophophelma varicoloraria is a moth of the family Geometridae first described by Frederic Moore in 1868. It is found in China (Hunan, Guangxi, Beijing, Xizang, Hainan, Jiangxi, Sichuan).

References

Moths described in 1868
Pseudoterpnini